= Khavati =

Village in Maharashtra

- Village
- Interactive map of Khavati
- Country: India
- State: Maharashtra

Khavati is a small village in Ratnagiri district, Maharashtra state in Western India. The 2011 Census of India recorded a total of 1,453 residents in the village. Khavati's geographical area is approximately 935 hectares (2,310 acres).
